
Gmina Pomiechówek is a rural gmina (administrative district) in Nowy Dwór County, Masovian Voivodeship, in east-central Poland. It takes its name from the village of Pomiechówek, but its seat is Brody-Parcele, which lies approximately 5 kilometres (3 mi) north-east of Nowy Dwór Mazowiecki and 33 km (20 mi) north-west of Warsaw.

Villages
Gmina Pomiechówek contains the villages and settlements of Błędówko, Błędowo, Brody, Brody-Parcele, Bronisławka, Cegielnia-Kosewo, Czarnowo, Falbogi Borowe, Goławice Drugie, Goławice Pierwsze, Kikoły, Kosewko, Kosewo, Nowe Orzechowo, Nowy Modlin, Pomiechówek, Pomiechowo, Pomocnia, Śniadówko, Stanisławowo, Stare Orzechowo, Szczypiorno, Wójtostwo, Wola Błędowska, Wólka Kikolska, Wymysły and Zapiecki.

Neighbouring gminas
Gmina Pomiechówek is bordered by the town of Nowy Dwór Mazowiecki and by the gminas of Nasielsk, Serock, Wieliszew and Zakroczym.

References

External links
 Polish official population figures 2006

Pomiechowek
Nowy Dwór Mazowiecki County